Charles Janssens (8 June 1906 – 23 August 1986) was a Belgian film actor. He became known for his comic roles in films made with Edith Kiel and Jef Bruyninckx.

Filmography

References

Bibliography
 Mathijs, Ernest. The Cinema of the Low Countries. Wallflower Press, 2004.

External links

1906 births
1986 deaths
Belgian male television actors
Belgian male film actors
People from Borgerhout
20th-century Belgian male actors